Taïbet is a district in Touggourt Province, Algeria. It was named after its capital, Taibet. As of the 2008 census, the district had a total population of 44,683.

Communes
The district is further divided into 3 communes:
Taibet
Benaceur
M'Naguer

References

Districts of Ouargla Province